Liberian Kreyol is an outdated appellation for an Atlantic English-lexicon creole language  spoken in Liberia. Also known as Liberian kolokwa English, was spoken by 1,500,000 people as a second language (1984 census) which is about 70% of the population in that time. Today the knowledge of some form of English is even more widespread. It is historically and linguistically related to Merico, a creole spoken in Liberia, but is grammatically distinct from it. There are regional dialects such as the Kru kolokwa English used by the Kru fishermen.

Liberian Kreyol language developed from Liberian Interior Pidgin English, the Liberian version of West African vernacular English, though it has been significantly influenced by Liberian Settler English, itself based on American English, particularly African-American Vernacular English and Southern American English. Its phonology owes much to the indigenous Languages of Liberia. It has been analyzed having a post-creole continuum.  As such, rather than being a pidgin wholly distinct from English, it is a range of varieties that extend from the highly pidginized to one that shows many similarities to English as spoken elsewhere in West Africa. 

Kreyol originated in Liberia among the Settlers, the free English-speaking African Americans from the Southern United States who emigrated to Liberia between 1819 and 1860. It has since borrowed some words from French and from other West African languages.

Kreyol is spoken mostly as an intertribal lingua franca in the interior of Liberia.

Grammatical features
Kreyol uses no for negation, bi (be) as the copula, fɔ for "to" in verbal infinitives.

See also 
 Krio language, an English-based creole spoken in Sierra Leone
 Nigerian Pidgin

References

Languages of Liberia
English-based pidgins and creoles of Africa